Ballads of a Hangman is the 14th studio album by the German heavy metal band Grave Digger, and was released on 27 January 2009. It is the first Grave Digger album to feature two guitarists, the only one to feature Thilo Hermann who co-wrote the album but was asked to leave soon after its release and also the last one with Manni Schmidt who left the band in October 2009 due to personal differences with Chris Boltendahl.

The semi-ballad "Lonely The Innocence Dies" featuring Veronica Freeman of Benedictum was noted for being close to a harder version of "Where the Wild Roses Grow" by Kylie Minogue and Nick Cave.

Track listing 

All music composed by Boltendahl/Schmidt/Hermann

Album line-up 
 Chris Boltendahl - lead and backing vocals
 Manni Schmidt - guitars and backing vocals
 Thilo Hermann - guitars and backing vocals
 Jens Becker - bass
 Stefan Arnold - drums
 H.P. Katzenburg - keyboards

References 

2009 albums
Grave Digger (band) albums
Napalm Records albums